A Pillow Case of Mystery (Traditional Chinese: 施公奇案; literally The Curious Cases of Lord Sze) is a 2006 Hong Kong detective-fantasy television drama starring Bobby Au-yeung as the title character, Mr. Sze (Sze Sai-lun). Produced by Lam Chi-wah and edited by Lau Chi-wah, the drama is a TVB production. The original broadcast was on the TVB Jade network with 45-minute episodes airing five days a week from 31 January to 26 February 2006. The drama is set during the early 19th century Qing dynasty. Sze Sai-lun, the newly appointed magistrate of Kong-do County, accidentally encounters a spirit, enclosed in a magic pillow, who helps him solve cases.

Due to the drama's popular success, a follow-up sequel, A Pillow Case of Mystery II was produced and was released in 2010.

Premise
Sze Sai-lun (Bobby Au-yeung) becomes the new magistrate of Kong-do County. After a series of unresolved cases, the townspeople begin to see him as pathetic and useless. While Sai-lun was searching for evidence by a hillside, he accidentally injures himself, dropping blood on a mysterious pillow. He faints on it and discovers that the pillow encloses a spirit (Lo Hoi-pang) who can help him solve mysteries by giving him clues and riddles to solve. With the help of the pillow spirit, the townspeople begin to see a new light in Sai-lun.

Cast and characters

Main characters

Other characters

Viewership ratings

References

External links
TVB.com A Pillow Case of Mystery - Official Website 
TVBSquare.com A Pillow Case of Mystery - Review

TVB dramas
2006 Hong Kong television series debuts
2006 Hong Kong television series endings
Gong'an television series